Big in Europe is the forty-second album by Klaus Schulze, initially designed to be released in three volumes over three years. Only two volumes were released in 2013–14. Taking in consideration the previously released multi-disc box sets (Silver Edition, Historic Edition, Jubilee Edition, Contemporary Works I, and Contemporary Works II), it could be viewed as Schulze's one hundred and third album. This series of volumes chronicles Klaus Schulze's European tour with Lisa Gerrard in 2009.

Volume 1 (Warsaw)
The first volume of Big in Europe was released on 29 November 2013 and contains the entire performance in Warsaw, Poland on 17 September 2009, a concert dedicated to the 70th anniversary of the Soviet invasion of Poland during World War II. In addition to the CD, two DVDs are also included, the second of which contains the documentary "Moogomentary" and the first of which duplicates the audio disc. At this event, a promotional disc was available, Hommage à Polska, containing a new studio Klaus Schulze and Lisa Gerard track, not included on this release.

Track listing

Volume 2 (Amsterdam)
The second volume of Big in Europe was released on 19 September 2014, and contains the entire performance in Amsterdam, Netherlands on 20 September 2009. In addition to the two CDs, two DVDs are also included, the first duplicating the audio discs, and the second containing the second part of the "Moogomentary" documentary.

Track listing

Disc 1

Disc 2

Personnel
 Klaus Schulze – electronics
 Lisa Gerrard – vocals

References

External links
 Big in Europe at the official site of Klaus Schulze

Klaus Schulze albums
2013 albums
Klaus Schulze live albums